Cistus (from the Greek kistos) is a genus of flowering plants in the rockrose family Cistaceae, containing about 20 species (Ellul et al. 2002). They are perennial shrubs found on dry or rocky soils throughout the Mediterranean region, from Morocco and Portugal through to the Middle East, and also on the Canary Islands.

Cistus, with its many hybrids and cultivars, is commonly encountered as a garden flower.

The common name rockrose (rock rose in the UK) is applied to the species, a name also shared by the related genera Halimium, Helianthemum and Tuberaria, all in the family Cistaceae. The common name gum cistus is applied to resin-bearing species, especially C. ladanifer.

Description

The leaves are evergreen, opposite, simple, usually slightly rough-surfaced, 2–8 cm long. In a few species (notably C. ladanifer), the leaves are coated with a highly aromatic resin called labdanum.

They have showy 5-petaled flowers ranging from white to purple and dark pink, in a few species with a conspicuous dark red spot at the base of each petal.

Taxonomy

Phylogeny
Cistus and Halimium form a cohesive and the most derived clade within Cistaceae. Molecular phylogenetic analyses conducted between 2005 and 2011 confirm that Cistus species divide into two well-defined clades, neither of which was fully resolved internally. The first clade consists of those with purple and pink flowers (the "purple pink clade" or PPC). The second clade consists of those with white flowers or, in the case of Cistus parviflorus, pale pink flowers (the "white or whitish pink clade" or WWPC). Although the flower colour of C. parviflorus is anomalous, it has very short styles, otherwise characteristic of WWPC species. A hybrid origin has been suggested. A simplified cladogram is shown below:

Within the purple pink clade (PPC), C. crispus is consistently the first diverging species. C. albidus, C. creticus and C. heterophyllus form a well supported clade. Seven species endemic to the Canary Islands form a polytomy, resolved differently in different analyses, in which subtaxa of some species do not always cluster together. Within the white and whitish pink clade (WWPC), there is weak support for a clade consisting of C. clusii and C. munbyi; the other species either formed part of a polytomy or resolved differently in different analyses. Halimium and Cistus were regularly shown to be paraphyletic with respect to one another.

Species
The following species are recognised in the genus Cistus:

Cistus albidus L.
Cistus asper Demoly & R.Mesa
Cistus atlanticus (Humbert & Maire) Demoly
Cistus atriplicifolius Lam.
Cistus calycinus L.
Cistus chinamadensis Bañares & P.Romero
Cistus clusii Dunal
Cistus creticus L.
Cistus crispus L.
Cistus formosus Curtis
Cistus grancanariae Marrero Rodr., R.S.Almeida & C.Ríos
Cistus halimifolius L.
Cistus heterophyllus Desf.
Cistus horrens Demoly
Cistus inflatus Pourr. ex J.-P.Demoly, syn. Cistus psilosepalus Sweet
Cistus ladanifer L., including Cistus palhinhae N.D.Ingram – Gum Rockrose
Cistus lasianthus Lam.
Cistus lasiocalycinus (Boiss. & Reut.) Byng & Christenh.
Cistus laurifolius L.
Cistus libanotis L.
Cistus macrocalycinus (Pau) Byng & Christenh.
Cistus monspeliensis L. – Montpellier Cistus
Cistus munbyi Pomel
Cistus ocreatus C.Sm.
Cistus ocymoides Lam.
Cistus osbeckiifolius Webb
Cistus palhinhae N.D.Ingram
Cistus palmensis Bañares & Demoly
Cistus parviflorus Lam.
Cistus populifolius L.
Cistus pouzolzii Delile ex Gren. & Godr.
Cistus salviifolius L. – Salvia Cistus
Cistus sintenisii Litard. (syn. C. albanicus)
Cistus symphytifolius Lam.
Cistus tauricus C.Presl
Cistus umbellatus L.

Gallery

Hybrids
In addition a large number of hybrids have been recorded, including:

Cistus × aguilari O.E.Warb. (C. ladanifer × C. populifolius)
Cistus × akamantis Demoly
Cistus × albereensis Gaut. ex Rouy & Fouc.
Cistus × banaresii Demoly
Cistus × canescens Sweet
Cistus × cebennensis Aubin & J.Prudhomme
Cistus × cheiranthoides Lam.
Cistus × clausonii Font Quer & Maire
Cistus × conradiae Demoly
Cistus × corbariensis Pourr. (C. populifolius × C. salviifolius)
Cistus × cyprius Lam. (C. ladanifer × C. laurifolius)
Cistus × dansereaui P.Silva (C. ladanifer × C. inflatus)
Cistus × escartianus Demoly 
Cistus × florentinus Lam. (C. monspeliensis × C. salviifolius)
Cistus × hybridus Pourr. 
Cistus × incanus L. (C. albidus × C. crispus)
Cistus × ingwersenii Demoly 
Cistus × laxus Aiton (C. populifolius × C. inflatus ?)
Cistus × ledon Lam. (C. laurifolius × C. monspeliensis)
Cistus × matritensis Carazo Roman & Jiménez Alb.
Cistus × nigricans Pourr. (C. populifolius × C. monspeliensis)
Cistus × novus Rouy
Cistus × obtusifolius Sweet (C. inflatus × C. salviifolius)
Cistus × pauranthus Demoly (C. parviflorus × C. salviifolius)
Cistus × philothei Sennen & Mauricio
Cistus × platysepalus Sweet (C. monspeliensis × C. inflatus)
Cistus × pourretii Rouy & Foucaud
Cistus × purpureus Lam. (C. ladanifer × C. creticus)
Cistus × rodiaei Verg. (C. ladanifer × C. albidus)
Cistus × santae (Sauvage) Demoly
Cistus × skanbergii Lojac. (C. parviflorus × C. monspeliensis)
Cistus × stenophyllus Link (C. ladanifer × C. monspeliensis)
Cistus × timbalii Demoly
Cistus × verguinii Coste (C. ladanifer × C. salviifolius)
Cistus × vinyalsii Sennen

Ecology
They are thermophilous plants, which require open, sunny places. This plant genus is peculiar in that it has developed a range of specific adaptations to resist summer drought and frequent disturbance events, such as fire and grazing. In addition, it can form both ectomycorrhizas and arbuscular mycorrhizas. More than 200 ectomycorrhiza-forming fungal species belonging to 40 genera have been reported so far to be associated with Cistus. As with many other Cistaceae, the species of Cistus have the ability to form mycorrhizal associations with truffles (Tuber) and are thus able to thrive on poor sandy soils or rocks.  Cistus ladanifer has been found to have mycorrhizal associations with Boletus edulis, Boletus rhodoxanthus, and Laccaria laccata.

Cistus are the only host of Cytinus hypocistis, a small parasitic plant that lives on the roots and is noticeable only for a short period of time when in flower. The presence of the parasite does not seem to harm the host population.

Cistus species are used as food plants by the larvae of some Lepidoptera species including Coleophora confluella and Coleophora helianthemella, the latter recorded on Cistus monspeliensis.

Various Cistus species are known to emit volatile oils, rendering the plants flammable.

Cultivation
Cistuses are suitable for sunny gardens with a nearly frost-free Mediterranean climate. The hardiest of the species is C. laurifolius, which survived the hard frost at Royal Botanical Gardens at Kew in 1895 that eliminated all the cistuses save this and two white-flowered natural hybrids, C. × corbariensis, already grown by John Tradescant the Elder, and C. × loretii, a 19th-century introduction.

Cultivars
Cultivars (those marked  have gained the Royal Horticultural Society's Award of Garden Merit) include:

C. × aguilarii 'Maculatus'  
C. × argenteus 'Peggy Sammons' - pink flowers, grey-green leaves
C. × bornetianus ‘Jester’  
C. × cyprius  
C. × cyprius var. ellipticus 'Elma'  
C. × dansereaui 'Decumbens'  
C. × dansereaui 'Jenkyn Place'  
C. × florentinus - white flowers
C. ’Gordon Cooper’  
C. × hybridus - pink buds, white flowers
C. × laxus ‘Snow White’  
C. × lenis 'Grayswood Pink'  
C. × obtusifolius ‘Thrive’  
'C. 'Paladin' - large white flowers, dark green leaves
C. × pulverulentus 'Sunset'  
C. × purpureus  - pink petals with dark blotches near centre
C. × skanbergii - small pink flowers
C. 'Snow Fire'  
 ×Halimiocistus 'Ingwersenii'  
×Halimiocistus sahucii

Gallery

References

Bibliography
  Proposes merging Cistus and Halimium.

External links

 
Malvales genera
Taxa named by Carl Linnaeus